The 1897–98 Yale Bulldogs men's basketball team represented Yale University in college basketball during the 1897–98 season. The team finished the season with a 12–9 record. They were disqualified for playing a game against 4th Sep. Company in Yonkers but were later reinstated. Yale's coach was Henry S. Anderson and their team captain was William H. Peck.

Schedule

References

Yale
Yale Bulldogs men's basketball seasons
Yale Bulldogs Men's Basketball Team
Yale Bulldogs Men's Basketball Team